Anthony John Cross (born 5 August 1945) is a former English cricketer. Cross was a right-handed batsman who bowled right-arm off break. He was born at Fulmer, Buckinghamshire.

While studying at the University of Cambridge, he made his first-class debut for Cambridge University against Northamptonshire at Fenner's in 1966. He made four further first-class appearances for the university, the last of which came against Northamptonshire at Fenner's in 1967. In his five first-class matches for the university, he scored a total of 113 runs at an average of 16.14, with a high score of 39 not out. He later made a single first-class appearance for Warwickshire against Scotland in 1969 at Edgbaston. Scotland won the toss and elected to bat first, making 251/9 declared. Warwickshire responded in their first-innings by making 200/7 declared, with Cross scoring 18 runs before he was dismissed by Keith Hardie. Scotland then reached 155/6 declared in their second-innings, leaving Warwickshire with a target of 207 for victory. However, Warwickshire fell just short in their chase, making 202 all out, with Cross scoring 20 runs before he was dismissed by Hardie.

References

External links
Anthony Cross at ESPNcricinfo
Anthony Cross at CricketArchive

1945 births
Living people
People from South Bucks District
Alumni of the University of Cambridge
English cricketers
Cambridge University cricketers
Warwickshire cricketers